The Hon. Joshua Henry Mackenzie, Lord Mackenzie (1774 – 1871) was a 19th-century Scottish lawyer who rose to be a Senator of the College of Justice.

Early life

He was born in 1774 the eldest son of the Edinburgh author Henry Mackenzie and his wife, Penuel Grant. His maternal grandfather was Sir Ludovic Grant. He was named after his paternal grandfather, Dr Joshua Mackenzie. The family lived at Cowgatehead just off the Grassmarket in Edinburgh.

Career
In 1822 he was elected a Senator of the College of Justice taking the seat previously held by the late Lord Kinneder.

Personal life
He married Helen Anne Mackenzie (1799-1866), daughter of Lord Seaforth. Her sister, Mary Elizabeth Frederica Mackenzie, was the wife of  Vice Admiral Sir Samuel Hood and James Alexander Stewart of Glasserton. Together, Joshua and Helen were the parents of several children, including:

 Francis Lewis Mackenzie
 Henry Mackenzie
 Frances Mary Mackenzie
 Penuel Augusta Mackenzie.

In 1825 he was living at 6 Royal Circus in Edinburgh's Second New Town. In later life he moved to Belmont House, a substantial mansion west of the city, near Corstorphine.

He died on 17 November 1851. He is buried with his parents in Greyfriars Kirkyard. The grave lies against the retaining wall mid-way along the northern slope.

References

1774 births
1851 deaths
Lawyers from Edinburgh
Senators of the College of Justice
Burials at Greyfriars Kirkyard